Hanno Selg (31 May 1932 – 2 October 2019) was an Estonian modern pentathlete.

He was a member of the Soviet Union's modern pentathlon Olympic silver medal winning team and an individual 10th place in the 1960 Summer Olympics.

He was also individual champion of the USSR in 1960 and 6-time champion of the Estonian SSR.

References

1932 births
2019 deaths
Soviet male modern pentathletes
Modern pentathletes at the 1960 Summer Olympics
Olympic modern pentathletes of the Soviet Union
Olympic silver medalists for the Soviet Union
Sportspeople from Tartu
Estonian male modern pentathletes
Olympic medalists in modern pentathlon
Medalists at the 1960 Summer Olympics